Derby Arena is a multi-use indoor arena and velodrome at Pride Park in Derby, England. It was opened in 2015 and has hosted cycling, badminton and entertainment events.

Construction

Construction was expected to be completed in November 2014 with the opening of the venue originally scheduled for January 2015. In May 2012 its development seemed uncertain due to a change of local government. It was constructed by contractors Bowmer and Kirkland and was scheduled for completion in 2014. The Arena was finally opened three months late in March 2015 by Sarah Storey and Margaret Beckett. It is Britain's fifth 250-metre indoor track, which is raised to allow easy access to the 12 badminton court size infield area. There are also a café, fitness gym, group exercise studios and a spinning studio.

Also proposed was an outdoor  closed road circuit race track and a mountain bike skills area which would have been built on The Sanctuary bird and wildlife reserve. A coalition of 16 local wildlife conservation groups expressed concern at the proposal, but it was approved in February 2014. An injunction brought against Derby City Council by Derbyshire Wildlife Trust led to a Judicial Review being granted which could have overturned the planning approval. On 15 March 2014 Derby City Council announced it was abandoning its plans to develop the site.

In August 2014 a Derby-based company, Moda Bicycles, was appointed to provide 100 bicycles for hire at the Arena, which would be painted black-and-blue to match the Arena's branding.
Accreditation to be permitted to use the track will require a four-stage training course, taking six hours to complete at a cost of £65, announced in a package of charges in August 2014.

Events

Cycling
The Arena hosted its first major track meeting in August 2015, when it hosted the opening round of the 2015-16 Revolution series, featuring a number of Olympic and World champions including Bradley Wiggins, Mark Cavendish, Laura Trott, Joanna Rowsell Shand, Jason Kenny and Ed Clancy.

Badminton
National Badminton League franchise Team Derby played at the Arena during the league's first season in 2014–15, before relocating to the University of Derby Sports Centre.

Entertainment
Derby City Council relocated their annual pantomime to the Arena from 2015 onwards, following the fire-related closure of the former Assembly Rooms venue. Other events to take place at the Arena include comedy shows by Jimmy Carr and Russell Brand. The venue's first music concert took place in October 2016, with the Happy Mondays supported by The Bluetones and Cast.

References

External links

Velodromes in England
Sports venues in Derby
Indoor arenas in England
Badminton venues
Sports venues completed in 2015